Wondabyne railway station is located on the Main Northern line in New South Wales, Australia. It serves the southern Central Coast area known as Wondabyne and opened on 1 May 1889. It is the only station in Australia that does not have road access.

Wondabyne has a quarry that is used intermittently and several houses which can only be accessed by boat from a jetty next to the station. As Wondabyne is a request stop, not all trains stop there.

Wondabyne Station is mainly used by bushwalkers on the Great North Walk and the homeowners who live on the other side of Mullet Creek which is a tributary of the Hawkesbury River.

History
Wondabyne station was constructed with the Hawkesbury River Railway Bridge. Before the bridge opened, and after Woy Woy Tunnel was opened, railway traffic took a ferry from Mullet Creek railway station (1888-1897), 400 metres north of Wondabyne station.

Originally known as Mullet Creek for its nearby creek, Wondabyne station was built for its development of quarry. It was renamed to Hawkesbury Cabin in 1889 and Wondabyne in 1891 after Mt. Wondabyne close to the railway station across the bay.

Wondabyne was also renowned for its maritime transport industry. Along its creek are squatter houses, which were housed by fishermen; the area is still used for recreational fishing. Wondabyne was once a busy area and had a pub called The Centennial, which closed in 1891 shortly after the Hawkesbury River Railway Bridge was opened. There were also steamboat services, which took passengers from Wondabyne station along the Hawkesbury River to Brooklyn.

In April 1939, Wondabyne station was relocated to the current site.

Platforms and services
Wondabyne has two side platforms and despite the station's short length - less than one carriage long - it is fully equipped with an Opal card reader, announcements of approaching trains, security cameras, printed timetables and other posters relevant to the railways. The platforms are classified as SP1r (Alight from last car's rear door).

This station is one example of train stations that uses selective door operation.

Wondabyne is serviced by NSW TrainLink Central Coast & Newcastle Line services travelling from Sydney Central to Newcastle. It is a request stop with passengers required to notify the guard if they wish to alight and wave at the driver if they want to board. In both cases the rear door of the rear carriage corresponds with the platform.

References

External links

Wondabyne station details Transport for New South Wales

Transport on the Central Coast (New South Wales)
Railway stations in Australia opened in 1889
Railway stations in Australia opened in 1939
Regional railway stations in New South Wales
Short-platform railway stations in New South Wales, 1 car or less
Main North railway line, New South Wales